USS Tawakoni (ATF-114) was an  fleet ocean tug that served on active duty with the U.S. Navy from 1944 to 1978, seeing action in World War II, the Korean War and the Vietnam War.  After thirty-four years of service, she was sold to the Republic of China Navy (Taiwan), where she served until November 2020.

History

Service in the United States Navy
Tawakoni was named after a Caddoan Indian tribe of the Wichita group that lived in Texas on the banks of the middle Brazos and Trinity Rivers during the 18th and 19th centuries.  She began her naval career in the Pacific theater, joining the U.S. 5th fleet just in time for the invasion of Iwo Jima, which took place in February 1945.  During this battle Tawakoni assisted the destroyer minesweeper , which had been hit by two 250-pound bombs on 18 February.  She also assisted in retraction, towing and salvage operations off Iwo Jima until the latter part of March, when she returned to Ulithi for repairs to minor damage suffered during the battle.

On 6 April 1945, Tawakoni was involved in the invasion of Okinawa when she was attacked by several Japanese kamikaze planes while assisting the badly damaged  about fifty miles from the island.  Through maneuvering and gunnery on the part of her crew, the ship managed to down five Japanese aircraft while suffering minimal damage herself.  On 16 April Tawakoni participated in the invasion of Ie Shima, where she towed the damaged  to safety while downing yet another kamikaze plane.  On 1 July she made for Leyte in the Philippines, which is where V-J day found her.

Korean War
Following the Second World War Tawakoni generally operated in the Pacific area, performing towing and other services and visiting ports from the United States to Asia. In November 1950, she joined Task Force 90, Amphibious Force, Far East, operating in support of United Nations efforts in Korea. During the Korean War, she took part in three campaigns: Communist China Aggression (1950–51); First UN Counteroffensive (1951); and the Communist China Spring Offensive (1951).  She planted buoys in the channels at Wonsan, Hungnam and Inchon harbors, and provided towing services to ships of the United States 7th Fleet during her Korean service.

Operation Castle
In March 1954, Tawakoni was one of the ships tasked to support Operation Castle, a series of high-energy (high-yield) nuclear tests by Navy Joint Task Force SEVEN (JTF-7) at Bikini Atoll.  The highest level of contamination recorded aboard the ship during this operation was 0.2 mr/hr.

Vietnam War
During the Vietnam War, Tawakoni would see service in three campaigns: Vietnam Counteroffensive Phase VI (1968–69), Tet 69 Counteroffensive (1969), and Winter-Spring 1970.  During Phase VI, she participated in the surveillance of Soviet electronic intelligence trawlers monitoring U.S. operations in the Gulf of Tonkin.  She also assisted in towing, recovery and similar operations during her time in Vietnam. May 1967 she rescued .

Service in the Republic of China Navy
In June 1978, Tawakoni was decommissioned and sold to Taiwan under the Security Assistance Program, where she was recommissioned in the ROC Navy as ROCS Da Han (ATF-553).  She served with this force until November 2020.

Awards
Tawakoni was awarded the appropriate service medals for World War II (including the American Campaign Medal and the Asiatic-Pacific Campaign Medal), Korea and Vietnam.  She was also awarded two battle stars for her World War II service, three for her Korean War service, and four campaign stars for her Vietnam War service, together with a Combat Action Ribbon and a Navy Unit Commendation.  Her crew during these periods earned the Navy Occupation Service Medal, the Armed Forces Expeditionary Medal, and the Republic of Korea War Service Medal, among other awards.

Sources

USS Tawakoni (ATF-114). Contains basic info on the Tawakoni.
Dictionary of American Naval Fighting Ships, "USS Tawakoni".  Contains history of the Tawakoni.
History of USS Tawakoni (ATF-114) During Operation Castle 1954.  Gives details of Tawakonis activities during this nuclear test operation.

External links
Viet Cong Commandos Sank an American Aircraft Carrier Story of the salvage of the USS Card in Vietnam.

 

Abnaki-class tugs
Ships built in San Francisco
1944 ships
World War II auxiliary ships of the United States
Abnaki-class tugs of the Republic of China Navy